Frederick Burnham may refer to:

Frederick K. Burnham,  American motorboat racer, winner of the 1910 APBA Challenge Cup
Frederick Russell Burnham (1861–1947), American scout and world traveling adventurer
Frederick Ernest Burnham (1847–??), lawyer and politician in Manitoba, Canada